Albert Alan Owen ARAM (born 1948) is a British composer and musician.

Early life and education

Owen was born in Bangor, Wales in 1948. His father was Welsh and his mother Latvian (sister of the Latvian composer Alberts Jērums). In 1956 the family moved to Rhodesia (now Zimbabwe), where Owen grew up.
 He was educated at Alfred Beit, Ellis Robins, and Oriel Boys' High School in Salisbury (now Harare), and then at the Rhodesian College of Music (run by Eileen Reynolds). 
He played in the Rhodesian R&B band The Plebs.

Leaving Rhodesia in 1966 to continue his musical education in London, Owen studied piano with Harold Craxton and Angus Morrison and composition with Patrick Savill. Owen went to Paris to study composition with Nadia Boulanger (whom he continued seeing till her death in 1979) and piano with Jacques Février between 1969 and 1971. Returning to England, he went on to win the Charles Lucas Medal and Lady Holland Prize for composition at the Royal Academy of Music, and was a finalist in the National Piano Concerto Competition in 1974.

Career
Owen taught piano at the Junior School of the Royal Academy of Music for fifteen years, and also taught a number of courses at the Working Men's College for twelve years, and was the Dean of Studies there in 1990-91.

In the mid-1970s, Owen performed with David Russell and Simon Climie as the leader of the classical fusion group Erato, playing classical, free jazz and electronic improvisation. He also performed with Katherine Sweeney and Adrian Thompson in the Corilla Ensemble
, and with Sweeney, Milada Polasek and Peter Barnaby in the Emeryson Ensemble.

Owen's first recording of his own work, Keyboards and Strings, was released in 1979 while teaching at The John Lyon School and North London Collegiate School in London. Critics praised its "distinctive and original use of tone-colours". His second album, Following the Light was released in 1982, and was described as "an electronic-age tone poem" and "a work of modern impressionism based on many subtle variations of which Debussy himself could have approved". In 1987, it was included in the CD The Manhattan Collection (which included works by Keith Emerson), reached number 8 on the New Age chart, and was number 1 on the MP3.com Classical Minimalist chart in 2000.

Owen formed his own production company, Techno Arts Productions, in 1985 to release his recordings.

In 1985, he was asked to compose and arrange the finale of the Halley's Comet Royal Gala at the Wembley Conference Centre, a piece which used the massed forces of the New Symphony Orchestra, the London Chorale and the Royal Corps of Transport Band. His music has been used in film and TV and performed in the Wigmore Hall and Purcell Room.

Owen moved to Wales in 1990, where he continued to compose and taught classes in theory, harmony and counterpoint at the Aberystwyth Arts Centre. His private piano tuition has produced winners of the Urdd and National Eisteddfodau.

In 2002, Owen was elected as an Associate of the Royal Academy of Music for achieving distinction in the music profession.

In 2019, Owen's 1982 recording of Following The Light was reissued by French label Libreville Records in a limited edition of six hundred copies.

Owen's new work Chorales is due to be released by Libreville Records in 2022.

Works and recordings

Samples and covers

 In 2013, Killabee ft. Lil Phat sampled 'Late Late Show' from High Life on their single 'Call Life'.
 In 2014, Molts Records Kids covered 'Robot Rock' from High Life on their album La Canalla Balla, Vol. 1.
 In 2015, Kaytranada sampled 'High Life' from High Life on his track 'Go Ahead'.

References

External links
 Assorted Sounds with Zac Jackson - Albert Alan Owen Special
 Jonny Trunk - The OST Show - Albert Alan Owen

British composers
Zimbabwean composers
White Zimbabwean people
1948 births
Living people
Date of birth missing (living people)
Alumni of the Royal Academy of Music